Pipili is a town and a NAC under jurisdiction of Puri district in the Indian state of Odisha. It is famous for designing beautiful Applique handicrafts. It is a town of artisans famous for their colourful fabrics.

Geography
It has an average elevation of 25 metres (82 feet).

It is 36 kilometres from Puri, and 18 kilometers from Bhubaneswar, at the junction where the Konark road branches from the Bhubaneswar to Puri road.

Demographics
 India census, Pipili had a population of 14,263. Males constitute 51% of the population and females 49%. Pipili has an average literacy rate of 70%, higher than the national average of 59.5%: male literacy is 77%, and female literacy is 63%. In Pipili, 12% of the population is under 6 years of age.

As per Census-2011, the population of Pipili is 17,623 of which 9,036 are males and 8,587 are females.

Economy

The applique work of Pipili, also known as "chandua" in colloquial language, is probably most well known handicraft in Puri and surrounding area. Each and every family of darjisahi a well known applique village's people are engaged in this applique craft. This is livelihood of most people here.

Education

The Kidutopia Playschool/Preschool of Pipili is probably most well known for its world class environment and is managed by qualified engineer operating in Pipili bazaar and surrounding area. There is Govt college and Private science college along with various other training institutes for coaching. It's a compact and very pretty township with educated and aware citizens.

Politics
Current MLA from Pipli Assembly Constituency is Rudra Pratap Maharathy, son of Pradeep Maharathy of BJD. His father Pradeep Maharathy previously won 7 times from Pipili : 1985,1990,2000,2004,2009,2014,2019. He had won this seat representing JD in 1990 and representing JNP in 1985. Bipin Das of INC(I) in 1980, and Kiran Lekha Mohanty of JNP in 1977.

Pipli is part of Puri (Lok Sabha constituency).

References

Cities and towns in Puri district
Tourist attractions in Puri district